Koun-Fao Department is a department of Gontougo Region in Zanzan District, Ivory Coast. In 2021, its population was 167,881 and its seat is the settlement of Koun-Fao. The sub-prefectures of the department are Boahia, Kokomian, Kouassi-Datékro, Koun-Fao, Tankessé, and Tienkoikro.

History
Koun-Fao Department was created in 2005 as a second-level subdivision via a split-off from Tanda Department. At its creation, it was part of Zanzan Region.

In 2011, districts were introduced as new first-level subdivisions of Ivory Coast. At the same time, regions were reorganised and became second-level subdivisions and all departments were converted into third-level subdivisions. At this time, Koun-Fao Department became part of Gontougo Region in Zanzan District.

Notes

Departments of Gontougo
2005 establishments in Ivory Coast
States and territories established in 2005